This is a list of notable mosques in China. A mosque is a place of worship for followers of the religion of Islam. The first mosque in China was the Huaisheng Mosque in Guangzhou, built during the Tang dynasty in 627 CE. In of 2014 there were 39,135 mosques in China, in 2009 an estimated 25,000 of these were in Xinjiang, a north-west autonomous region, having a high density of one mosque per 500 Muslims.

In China, mosques are called Qīng Zhēn Sì ("Temples of the Pure Truth"), a name which was also used by Chinese Jews for synagogues. Other names include Huí Huí Táng ("Hui people's hall"), Huí Huí Sì ("Hui people's temple"), Lǐ Bài Sì ("Temple of worship"), Zhēn Jiào Sì ("Temple of the True Teaching") or Qīng Jìng Sì ("Pure and clean temple").

During the Qing dynasty, at the mosque entrance of Hui Mosques, a tablet was placed upon which "Huáng Dì Wàn Suì, Wàn Suì, Wàn Wàn Suì" was inscribed, which means, "The Emperor, may he live forever". Wansui means Ten thousand years, which means forever in Chinese. Westerners traveling in China noted the presence of these tablets at mosques in Yunnan and Ningbo.

Most mosques have certain aspects in common with each other however as with other regions Chinese Islamic architecture reflects the local architecture in its style. China is renowned for its beautiful mosques, which resemble temples. However, in western China the mosques resemble those of Iran and Central Asia, with tall, slender minarets, curvy arches and dome shaped roofs, as well as the unique multi-layered portals. In northwest China where the Chinese Hui have built their mosques, there is a combination of eastern and western styles. The mosques have flared Buddhist style roofs set in walled courtyards entered through archways with miniature domes and minarets.

The style of architecture of Hui Mosques varies according to their sect. The traditionalist Gedimu Hanafi Sunnis, influenced by Chinese culture, build Mosques which look like Chinese temples. The reformist modernist (but originally Wahhabi inspired) Yihewani build their Mosques to look like Arab style Mosques. As the reformists become more influential in China, some mosques in Chinese Islamic style are reconstructed into Arab style, e.g. Weizhou Grand Mosque. It caused the dissatisfaction of Chinese government, and eventually led to a counteraction of re-sinification of mosque architectures in China.

List of mosques

See also
 Islam in China
 Lists of mosques
 List of mosques in Hong Kong
 List of mosques in Taiwan

References

Citations

Sources

External links

 Mosques in China, a gallery at the site of the Institute for Research and Studies of Muslim Minorities (IRSMM)
 Islamic Architecture in Xinjiang
 Islamic Architecture in Xinjiang